Mutya Pilipinas 2019 is the 51st edition of the Mutya Pilipinas pageant (formerly known as Mutya ng Pilipinas) under the new leadership of Cory Quirino. It was held at the Mall of Asia Arena in Pasay, Metro Manila, Philippines on August 18, 2019.

At the end of the event, Sharifa Akeel  crowned Klyza Castro as Mutya Pilipinas Asia Pacific International 2019. Including her crowned are the new court of winners: April May Short was crowned as Mutya Pilipinas  World Top Model 2019, Tyra Goldman was crowned as Mutya Pilipinas Tourism International 2019, and Louise Janica An was crowned as Mutya Pilipinas Overseas Communities 2019. Cyrille Payumo was named First Runner-Up, and Maxinne Nicole Rangel was named Second Runner-Up.

Later that year, Tyra Goldman was replaced by Cyrille Payumo as the representative of the Philippines to the Miss Tourism International 2019 pageant due to her dual citizenship. Goldman eventually competed internationally at the Top Model of the World contest in January the following year.

Results
Color keys
  The contestant Won in an International pageant.
  The contestant was a Semi-Finalist in an International pageant.

Special Awards

Major Awards and Sponsor Awards

Contestants
40 contestants competed for the four titles.

References

External links 
 Mutya ng Pilipinas

2019
Mutya Pilipinas 2019
2019 in the Philippines